José María Jáuregui is a town in the Luján Partido of Buenos Aires Province, Argentina.

See also
Club Social y Deportivo Flandria

External links

 Jáuregui
 Parque Industrial Flandria

Populated places in Buenos Aires Province